Iñaki Goikoetxea Beristain (born 6 May 1982 in Deba, Gipuzkoa) is a Spanish former professional footballer who played as a striker, and is the current manager of Real Unión.

External links

1982 births
Living people
People from Debabarrena
Spanish footballers
Footballers from the Basque Country (autonomous community)
Association football forwards
Segunda División players
Segunda División B players
CD Basconia footballers
Bilbao Athletic footballers
Barakaldo CF footballers
SD Lemona footballers
Real Unión footballers
CF Badalona players
SD Amorebieta footballers
Aviron Bayonnais FC players
Spanish expatriate footballers
Expatriate footballers in France
Spanish football managers
Real Unión managers